Arthur Gaskell (26 April 1886–1944) was an English footballer who played in the Football League for Bolton Wanderers. After his playing career was over Gaskell became a coach and went on to manage Swiss side Grasshopper Club Zürich and then Yugoslav side HŠK Građanski Zagreb where he won the 1923 Yugoslav Football Championship.

References

1886 births
1944 deaths
English footballers
Association football midfielders
English Football League players
Bolton Wanderers F.C. players
Macclesfield Town F.C. players
HŠK Građanski Zagreb managers